Sir Gilbert Gerard (c 1618 – 1683) supported the Parliamentary cause in the English Civil War,  held a number of positions during the Protectorate, sat in the House of Commons in the Convention Parliament of 1660, and was knighted shortly after the Restoration.

Biography
Gerard was a younger son of Sir Gilbert Gerard, 1st Baronet of Harrow on the Hill and his wife Mary Barrington, daughter of Sir Francis Barrington. He was admitted at Emmanuel College, Cambridge on 20 August 1634. From 1640 to 1653 he was Clerk of the Council of the Duchy of Lancaster and was a commissioner for volunteers for Middlesex in 1644. He was a member of Gray's Inn and was called to the bar in 1648. He was Clerk of the Council of the Duchy of Lancaster from 1655 and was commissioner for alienations in 1656 and for forest appeals in 1657.

In 1660, Gerard was elected Member of Parliament for Westminster in the Convention Parliament. He was knighted on 18 March 1661. Gerard died unmarried in 1683 and was buried at Harrow on 5 November 1683.

References

Sources

1618 births
1683 deaths
English MPs 1660
Alumni of Emmanuel College, Cambridge
Members of Gray's Inn
People from Lancaster, Lancashire